Amasiya, Armenia may refer to:
Amasiya, Armavir
Amasiya, Shirak

See also
Amasia (disambiguation)